Obudu Plateau is a plateau found on the Oshie Ridge of the Sankwala Mountain range, in Cross River State, in the southeast of Nigeria. The plateau is found in Obanliku local government area of the Cross River State. The plateau extends towards Nigeria's south eastern border. The plateau is a habitat of rare species of birds.

Geography 
Obudu Plateau is found on the Oshie Ridge, one of the two ridges that make up the Sankwala Mountains in Cross River state of Nigeria (the other being the Sankwala ridge itself from which the mountain range takes its name). The terrain of the Obudu Plateau is hilly with deep gorges.

Climate 
The climate on the Obudu Plateau is comparatively cold. The plateau receives heavy and abundant rainfall during the rainy season. A total of 4,200 millimeters of rainfall is received on the plateau between April to November. Orographic activity is a factor contributing to the heavy rainfall. Clouds coming into southern Nigeria from the Atlantic Ocean drop their moisture content onto the plateau as the barrier of the Sankwala mountains forces the cloud upward and the resulting rapid cooling is followed by heavy rainfall on the plateau.

History 
The Sankwala mountain ranges were first explored in 1949 by McCaughley, a Scottish rancher who camped out in the mountains for a month, before returning with Hugh Jones – a fellow rancher who, in 1951, together with Crawfeild developed a cattle ranch on the plateau known as the Obudu Cattle Ranch. Although the ranch has been through troubles since, it has very recently been rehabilitated to its former glory by the South African Protea hotel chain.

A cable car transport network takes visitors from the foot of the mountain to the top of the plateau. An airstrip is located at the foot of the plateau for visitors reaching the plateau by air from other parts of the world.

References 

Plateaus of Nigeria
Cameroonian Highlands forests